The C.M.R. Institute of Technology is an undergraduate and postgraduate engineering college in Hyderabad, India. It was established in 2005 and is affiliated to Jawaharlal Nehru Technological University, Hyderabad. CMR Institute of Technology is now an autonomous institution. It is known as CMRIT with Eamcet College Code : CMRM.

Admissions-intake 
Admissions are made by the Convenor of EAMCET and ICET on Counselling. The institute also admits under the NRI Category.
 Computer Science and Engineering (CSE) - 240 seats
 Artificial Intelligence and Data Science(AI & DS) - 60 seats
 Computer Science and Engineering (AI & ML) - 180 seats
 Electronics and Communication Engineering (ECE) - 240 seats
 Computer Science Engineering (Data Science) - 180 seats
 Master of Business Administration (MBA) - 120 seats
 M.Tech. - Artificial Intelligence and Data Science - 12 seats

Industry associations 
The institute has associations and MOUs with a lot of industries in various fields for imparting training to students at a professional level, some of them include Amazon Aws, Microsoft, Internshala, Redhat Academy, Aspiring Minds, Zensar Technologies.

Naac Credits CMR institute of Technology in Telangana 
CMR Group Partners with Amazon Aws for Training Btech Students

See also 
Education in India
Literacy in India
List of institutions of higher education in Telangana

References

External links
CMR Institute of Technology Official Website

Engineering colleges in Hyderabad, India
All India Council for Technical Education
2005 establishments in Andhra Pradesh
Educational institutions established in 2005